Laukpya ( or), was the ruler of the Bassein province of the Martaban–Hanthawaddy Kingdom from 1364 to 1388. He came to power by helping his brother Byattaba stage a coup against King Binnya U. He was also a key figure who started the Forty Years' War (c. 1385–1424) between the Mon-speaking Hanthawaddy Pegu and the Burmese-speaking Ava.

Brief
Laukpya was appointed governor of Myaungmya, a key port in the Irrawaddy delta by King Binnya U. In 1364, Laukpya's eldest brother Byattaba, then a senior official, seized the Martaban province south of Donwun while Laukpya seized the entire Bassein province. In 1371/72, the rebel brothers and the king signed a treaty that allowed the brothers to be his nominal vassals. In 1384, the brothers refused to extend the same recognition to Binnya U's son and successor Razadarit. In 1385, as Razadarit prepared to march to the delta, Laukpya sought assistance from King Swa Saw Ke of Ava with the promise of submission to Ava.

Laukpya's wrote to Swa:
Glorious king, the ungrateful son, who was rebel when his father was alive, now has dared to ascend the great Binnya U's throne, assuming the title of "Razadarit". Before he can make his position secure, I beg my lord to attack Pegu both by land and by water. Your humble servant holds both Bassein and Myaungmya, and shall attack Pegu by water. When you have achieved your great triumph, take all the treasures for yourself; as to your humble servant, grant him only the annual revenue.

Swa's acceptance of Laukpya's invitation resulted in the Forty Years' War between Ava and Pegu. Swa's inaugural invasions of Hanthawaddy in 1385–86 and 1386–87 could not break Razadarit's defenses. In 1388/89, Razadarit attacked the delta. Razadarit's army could not take Myaungmya, which was heavily fortified, and was defeated at Bassein which was defended by Laukpya's three sons. Then Laukpya ventured out of his defenses, and was promptly captured by Razadarit's forces. Myaungmya surrendered in 1390. The entire delta followed. Laukpya's son Bya Kun and son-in-law Bya Kyin both fled to Ava. Swa welcomed the princes, and made Bya Kun governor of Salin and Bya Kyin, governor of Prome (Pyay).

Laukpya had 16 wives and 70 children.

Notes

References

Bibliography
 
 
 
 
 
 

Hanthawaddy dynasty
Burmese people of Mon descent